The Hall of Fame of Delaware Women was established in 1981 by the Delaware Commission for Women, a division of the Secretary of State of Delaware. The hall of fame recognizes the achievements and contributions of Delaware women in a variety of fields and includes activists, artists, athletes, military personnel and scientists.

The Delaware Commission for Women is a state agency with members appointed by the Governor representing Wilmington and each of Delaware's three counties (New Castle, Kent and Sussex). In making its selections for the Hall of Fame, the Commission prioritizes civil rights, economic empowerment, violence prevention, women's health, work, family, recognition and celebration. Eligible women must have been born in Delaware or resided in the state for a minimum of ten years.

Inductees

References

External links
Delaware Commission for Women website

1981 establishments in Delaware
Delaware
Women
Lists of American women
Delaware Women
Women in Delaware
History of women in Delaware